Dark Night of the Soul is a studio album by Danger Mouse and Sparklehorse, featuring collaborations by numerous notable musicians. Its release was postponed due to a legal dispute with the album's distributor EMI. It was finally released in July 2010, about a year after it had been leaked to the Internet and Danger Mouse had released a blank CD-R as a way of working around the dispute.

The album was commercially successful in the United Kingdom, and was well-received by music critics.

Content 

The title of the album derives from La noche oscura del alma, the title given to a poem by 16th-century Spanish poet Juan de la Cruz John of the Cross.

Dark Night of the Soul features a wide range of collaborators, including James Mercer of The Shins, Wayne Coyne of The Flaming Lips, Gruff Rhys of Super Furry Animals, Jason Lytle of Grandaddy, Julian Casablancas of The Strokes, Black Francis of the Pixies, Iggy Pop, Nina Persson of The Cardigans, Suzanne Vega, Vic Chesnutt, David Lynch, and Scott Spillane of Neutral Milk Hotel and The Gerbils; these singers also had a hand in composing and producing the work.

Release

Legal dispute with EMI 

The album was the subject of a legal dispute with the project's record label EMI. It was initially reported in early 2009 that there was a possibility that the album might never see release. However, the book was made available for sale on the official website of Dark Night of the Soul, bundled with a blank recordable CD-R. All copies were clearly labeled as follows:

The audio portion of the album was widely leaked around the same time.

Without going into detail, EMI acknowledged the legal dispute and released the following statement:

Both parties of the dispute remained silent about the particulars, but it is believed that the problems with distribution centered on a record deal that Danger Mouse signed with Lex Records.

In early 2010, it was announced that Dark Night of the Soul was slated for a tentative summer 2010 release, even though the CD-R version had been available since the previous May. A Lex Records logo appears next to the Capitol Records logo on the final version.

Official release 

The full album was officially released July 12, 2010, in multiple formats. The album features a hand-numbered 100-plus-page book of photos taken by David Lynch, said to be a visual narrative for the music. This book was limited to 5,000 copies.

This was the final album that Sparklehorse leader Mark Linkous completed before his suicide on March 6, 2010, although In the Fishtank 15—recorded in 2007—was released later, and Linkous was working on another LP at the time of his death. It was also one of the final works recorded by Vic Chesnutt before his own suicide.

Reception 

Dark Night of the Soul reached No. 32 in the UK Albums Chart. It has been-well received by music critics. PopMatters wrote: "Few contemporary pop albums have spoken to the human condition so eloquently, and given the listener so much pleasure in the process, than Dark Night of the Soul. It's no exaggeration to say Danger Mouse and Sparklehorse have crafted a near-masterpiece." The New York Times was less favourable, writing: "especially for a record that required so much effort, too much here feels incidental. Dark Night may end up being the final document on the ineffectiveness of Danger Mouse, a better conceptualist and prankster than producer."

Track listing

Personnel

Musicians
 Black Francis - Lead Vocals (5), Background Vocals (5)
 Julian Casablancas - Lead Vocals (4), Background Vocals (4), Solo Guitar (4)
 Vic Chesnutt - Vocals (12)
 Wayne Coyne - Lead Vocals (1), Background Vocals (1)
 Danger Mouse - Bass (7, 9), Piano (3, 7, 10), Organ (2, 7, 11), Wurlitzer (1, 2, 8, 9, 13), Mellotron (6), Keyboards (7), Synthesizer (1, 2, 3, 4, 5, 6, 8, 10, 11, 12), Drums (12), Percussion (5), Programming (2, 4, 5, 6, 7, 9, 10, 11)
 Steven Drozd - Background Vocals (1), Harmony Vocals (1), Guitar (1), Organ (1), Synthesizer (1), Drums (1), Programmed Drums (1), Programmed Strings (1)
 Dean Hurley - Electric Guitar (13), Organ (13), Drums (13), Percussion (13)
 Nathan Larson - Solo Guitar (6)
 Mark Linkous - Lead Vocals (10), Background Vocals (10), Guitar (1), Acoustic Guitar (2, 3, 4, 5, 6, 7, 9, 10, 11), Electric Guitar (2, 3, 4, 5, 6, 7, 8, 9, 10, 11, 13), Baritone Guitar (13), Bass (2, 5, 6, 8, 10), Electric Bass (1), Hohner Bass (1), Piano (7), Toy Piano (7), Organ (9), Rhodes (2), Optigan (8, 12, 13), Synthesizer (2, 4), Speak 'n Spell (13), Drums (1, 9), Programming (4, 7, 9, 11)
 Daniele Luppi - Clavioline (5), String Arrangement (1, 2, 3, 5, 7, 9, 10)
 David Lynch - Vocals (7, 13), Guitar (13), Synthesizer (13), Sound Effects (13)
 Jason Lytle - Lead Vocals (3, 8), Background Vocals (3, 8), Electric Guitar (8), Solo Guitar (3), Synthesizer (8), Programming (3)
 Heather McIntosh - Horn Arrangement (13)
 James Mercer - Lead Vocals (9), Background Vocals (2, 9)
 Money Mark - Intro Piano (2)
 Steve Nistor - Wurlitzer (1, 2), Drums (2, 3, 5, 6, 8, 10), Percussion (2, 3)
 Nina Persson - Lead Vocals (10), Background Vocals (10)
 Iggy Pop - Vocals (6)
 Gruff Rhys - Lead Vocals (2)
 Sonus Quartet - Strings (1, 2, 3, 5, 7, 9, 10)
 Scott Spillane - Horns (13), Horn Arrangement (13)
 Suzanne Vega - Lead Vocals (11), Background Vocals (11)

Technical
 Production - Danger Mouse, Mark Linkous
 Engineering - Mark Linkous, Kennie Takahashi, Todd Monfalcone
 Additional Engineering - Steven Drozd (1), Sir Doufous Styles (2), Jason Lytle (3, 8), Tom Gardner (4), Jason Carter (5), Hart Gunther (6), Dean Hurley (7, 13), Britt Myers (11), Vic Chesnutt (12), Bill Doss (13)
 Mixing - Danger Mouse, Mark Linkous, Kennie Takahashi
 Mix Assistants - Todd Monfalcone, Mike Laza, Alyssa Pittaluga
 Score Preparation - Anton Riehl (1, 2, 3, 5, 7, 9, 10)
 Mastering - Stephen Marcussen at Marcussen Mastering
 Visuals - David Lynch
 Artwork - Jacob Escobedo
 Layout - Jacob Escobedo
 Management - Ian Montone at Monotone, Inc. (Dark Night Of The Soul and Danger Mouse), Shelby Meade/Fresh and Clean (Mark Linkous)
 A&R - Jeff Antebi
 Artist Development - Jeff Antebi
 Legal - William Berrol, Esq., Craig Averill, Esq.

Charts

References

External links 

 

Albums produced by Danger Mouse (musician)
Danger Mouse (musician) albums
Sparklehorse albums
2010 albums
Collaborative albums
Capitol Records albums
Albums published posthumously
Books by David Lynch